Distal hereditary motor neuropathy, Jerash type is a protein that in humans is encoded by the HMNJ gene.

References

Further reading 

 

Genes
Human proteins